Fort Diggings Hollow is a valley in Crawford County in the U.S. state of Missouri.

Fort Diggings Hollow derives its name from Pat Fort, a local prospector.

References

Valleys of Crawford County, Missouri
Valleys of Missouri